Tyger Takes On... is a British television documentary show shown on BBC Three which began airing on 15 May 2014. The show follows actor Tyger Drew-Honey as he explores life hardships that young people have to face. The first series contained three episodes, the show ended on 5 June 2014. Drew-Honey confirmed, during his appearance on Sunday Brunch in August 2014, that a second series of the show had been commissioned. The second series consisted of two episodes.

Episodes

Series 1

Series 2

Broadcast 
The series premiered in Australia on 5 August 2015 on BBC Knowledge.

References

External links

2014 British television series debuts
2015 British television series endings
BBC television documentaries
British documentary television series
English-language television shows